The military of Germany refers to the Bundeswehr, the current armed forces of Germany (and West Germany prior to reunification) since 1955.

Military of Germany may also refer to:

 Imperial German Army (1871–1919), armed forces of the German Empire (lit. Imperial Army)
 Reichswehr (1919–1935), armed forces of the Weimar Republic (lit. Imperial Force)
 Wehrmacht (1935–1945), armed forces of Nazi Germany (lit. Defence Force)
 National People's Army (1956–1990), armed forces of the former German Democratic Republic of eastern Germany, prior to the reunification (lit. National People's Army)